Mikhail Lermontov (1814–1841), was a Russian poet.

Lermontov may also refer to:
 Lermontov (town), a town in Stavropol Krai, Russia
 Lermontov Urban Okrug, a municipal formation which the town of krai significance of Lermontov in Stavropol Krai, Russia is incorporated as
 Lermontov (crater), a crater on Mercury
 MS Mikhail Lermontov, a Soviet ocean liner
 2222 Lermontov, a main-belt asteroid

See also 
 Lermontova (disambiguation)
 Lermontovo (disambiguation)